This is a list of notable Australian Turks.

Academia
Vecihi Başarın, historian
Serdar Kuyucak, associate professor at the University of Sydney

Activists
Pembe Mentesh, campaigner and supporter of women's rights (Turkish Cypriot origin)

Arts and literature
Filiz Behaettin, International best-selling author, writer and speaker (Turkish Cypriot origin)
Mutlu Çerkez, conceptual artist (Turkish Cypriot origin)
Mertim Gokalp, artist

Business
Bulent Hass Dellal, director and chairman of the Special Broadcasting Service (Turkish Cypriot origin) 
John Ilhan, founder of Crazy John's mobile phone retail chain and the richest Australian under 40 years old in 2003
Huss Mustafa, senior executive at Commonwealth Bank of Australia; established the Australian Turkish Business Council (Turkish Cypriot origin)

Cinema and television
 
Deniz Akdeniz, actor
Tahir Bilgiç, comedian, film and television actor
Serhat Caradee, filmmaker
Didem Erol, actress
David Gulasi, social media celebrity 
Sinem Saban,  film writer, producer, director, and human rights activist (Turkish Cypriot origin)
Serpil Senelmis, broadcaster

Fashion and design
Leyla Acaroglu, designer, sustainability innovator, and educator
Şener Besim, jeweller 
Abdulla Elmaz, surrealist fashion photographer

Food
Ibrahim Kasif, celebrity chef (Turkish Cypriot origin)
Somer Sivrioğlu, celebrity chef
Ismail Tosun, celebrity chef (Turkish and Turkish Cypriot origin)

Music
Albert Arlen, pianist
Işın Çakmakcıoğlu, violinist and a member of the Melbourne Symphony Orchestra  (Turkish German origin)
Maya Jupiter, rapper (Turkish mother)
Deniz Tek, a founding member of Australian rock group Radio Birdman (Turkish father)

Politics
 
John Eren, member of the Labour party
Tayfun Eren, former  member of the Labour party, and first Turkish-born politician to be elected to a Parliament in Australia
Hutch Hussein, State President of the Victorian branch of the Australian Labor Party (ALP) between 2016 and 2019 (Turkish Cypriot origin)
Adem Somyurek, member of the Labour party
Nazlı Süleyman,  member of the Labour party (Turkish Cypriot origin)
Mehmet Tillem, member of the Labour party

Sports
 
 

Jack Aziz,  Australian rules football player (Turkish Cypriot origin)
Tansel Başer, football player
Aziz Behich, football player (Turkish Cypriot origin)
Kerem Bulut, football player
Tayfun Devrimol, football player 
Taylin Duman, Australian rules football player 
Nazim Erdem, wheelchair rugby Paralympic gold and silver medalist
İsyan Erdoğan, football player
Şeyma Erenli, football player 
Aytek Genc, football player
Errol Gulden, Australian rules football player
Emre Guler, rugby player  
Ersan Gülüm, football player
Musa Ilhan, wrestler 
Ersin Kaya, football player
Birkan Kirdar, football player 
Gülcan Koca, football player 
Selin Kuralay, football player
Funda Nakkaşoğlu, basketball player
Levent Osman, football player (Turkish Cypriot origin)
Tolgay Özbey, football player
Aiden Sezer, rugby player (Turkish father) 
Sedat Sir, Australian rules football player
Tarık Solak, kickboxing promoter
Ufuk Talay, football player 
Ramazan Tavşancıoğlu, football player
Mehmet Yağcı, weightlifter 
Servet Uzunlar, football player

See also 
Turkish Australian
List of Australians

References

 
Australians
Turkish